Khanty-Mansiysk (lit. Khanty-Mansi Town; Khanty: , Jomvoćś; Mansi: , Abga) is a city and the administrative centre of Khanty-Mansi Autonomous Okrug–Yugra, Russia. It stands on the eastern bank of the Irtysh River,  from its confluence with the Ob, in the oil-rich region of Western Siberia. Though an independent city, Khanty-Mansiysk also functions as the administrative centre of Khanty-Mansiysky District.

Khanty-Mansiysk is one of few capitals of Russian regions that is not the largest city in the area, surpassed by Surgut, Nizhnevartovsk and Nefteyugansk.

Etymology
The city's name consists of the names of the local indigenous people Khanty and Mansi and includes "-sk" ending which is a typical Russian ending for town names. Before 1940 these people were known as Ostyaks and Voguls respectively and the city's name (then settlement) was Ostyako-Vogulsk.

Geography

Climate
Khanty-Mansiysk experiences a subarctic climate (Köppen climate classification Dfc).

History
It was founded in 1930 as a work settlement of Ostyako-Vogulsk.

Administrative and municipal status
Khanty-Mansiysk is the administrative centre of the autonomous okrug and, within the framework of administrative divisions, it also serves as the administrative centre of Khanty-Mansiysky District, even though it is not a part of it. As an administrative division, it is incorporated separately as the town of okrug significance of Khanty-Mansiysk—an administrative unit with the status equal to that of the districts. As a municipal division, the town of okrug significance of Khanty-Mansiysk is incorporated as Khanty-Mansiysk Urban Okrug.

Demographics
Population: . Ethnic composition (2010):
 Russians – 73%
 Tatars – 5.3%
 Khanty – 3.9%
 Ukrainians – 3.1%
 Tajiks – 2.0%
 Azeris – 2.0%
 Mansi – 1.6%
 Kyrgyz – 1.3%
 Uzbeks – 1.2%
 Others – 6.6%

Transportation

Air travel is available at the Khanty-Mansiysk Airport, located just outside Khanty-Mansiysk inner city. The airline Utair has its head office at the airport.

Sports
Khanty-Mansiysk is a skiing and alpine skiing centre. Biathlon World Cup competitions are annually held in the city, and tourism infrastructure has been developed here quite well. The city was the venue of the 2003 and 2011 Biathlon World Championships, and in 2005 the first Mixed Biathlon Relay Championships took place here, and again in 2010.
The 2011 IPC Biathlon and Cross-Country Skiing World Championships where skiers with a physical disability compete, took place in Khanty-Mansiysk in March–April 2011 as well.

Khanty-Mansiysk was home to the 2015 Winter Deaflympics and the HC Yugra of the Supreme Hockey League.

The city includes the Ugra Chess Academy, which has been the venue of the 2010 Chess Olympiad and the Women's World Chess Championship 2012. In 2010, the Olympic Hotel was built just to house the players in the Olympiad. It also hosted the 2005 Chess World Cup, the 2007 Chess World Cup, the 2009 Chess World Cup and the 2011 Chess World Cup. It hosted the World Rapid and Blitz Championship in 2013 and the 2014 Candidates Tournament.

In May 2015, the FIDE Grand Prix tournament was held here.
The 2018 FIDE Women's World Championship was held here on November 2–23, 2018. It included 64 chess players from 28 countries and was won by Ju Wenjun.

Partnership cities
  Yerevan, Armenia (since 2014)

References

Notes

Sources

External links

Official website of Khanty-Mansiysk 
Khanty-Mansiysk Business Directory 
World Chess Cup 2009 website
The biggest portal in Khanty-Mansiysk 
Photo Gallery by Sergey Dolya

 
Cities and towns in Khanty-Mansi Autonomous Okrug
Populated places established in 1930
1930 establishments in Russia
Cities and towns built in the Soviet Union
Ski areas and resorts in Russia
Populated places on the Irtysh River